Tom Prendergast (born 1943 in Castlemaine, County Kerry) is an Irish former sportsperson.  He played Gaelic football with his local club Keel and was a member of the Kerry county team at senior level in the 1960s and 1970s. He won the Texaco Footballer of the Year in 1970. During the 1960s he also played with Wicklow, Donegal and Cork.

At club level with Keel he won a Kerry Intermediate Football Championship, Kerry Junior Football Championship and a number of Mid Kerry Senior Football Championship, he also won a Kerry Senior Football Championship with Mid Kerry. He also played hurling with the Killarney club and won a County Hurling Championship medal in 1969.

References

 

1943 births
Living people
Keel Gaelic footballers
Killarney hurlers
Kerry inter-county Gaelic footballers
Cork inter-county Gaelic footballers
Wicklow inter-county Gaelic footballers
Donegal inter-county Gaelic footballers
Munster inter-provincial Gaelic footballers